Byšice is a municipality and village in Mělník District in the Central Bohemian Region of the Czech Republic. It has about 1,400 inhabitants.

Etymology

The name is believed to originate from the personal name Byš.

Geography
It lies in the Jizera Table plateau.

History
The first written mention of Byšice is from 1321. The settlement was founded on a trade route from Mělník to Mladá Boleslav. It was an agricultural and market village, in the 19th century it was a market town.

The seal comes from the 15th or 16th century. The coat of arms is derived from this seal.

Demographics

Economy
In Byšice is located one of the most significant Czech food-producing companies, Vitana. The company was founded in 1919 as Graf and it was moved into Byšice in 1927. In 2013 it became a part of the Orkla ASA conglomerate. 

A large part of the municipal territory is agricultural land, which is managed by several entities.

Sights

The most valuable building is the Church of St. John the Baptist. It is a Baroque building from 1690–1693. The church has been protected as a cultural monument.

The church is a single rectangular building. It has a rectangular, triangular-ended presbytery. There is a rectangular sacristy in the axis of the building. The façade of the church is divided by pilasters. There are niches in the side fields of the façade. In the middle of the facade is a rectangular portal with a supraport and a rectangular window with a segmental niche. In the side parts of the facade above the pilasters takes place laying. Above the middle part is a ledge. The façade is finished with a wing gable with vases, pilasters and niches. The side facades have lysine frames and semicircular windows.

The presbytery and the sacristy have a barrel vault with lunettes. The ship has a flat ceiling. There is an indistinct stucco decoration on the vault and wall of the presbytery and the semicircular triumphal arch. The walls of the nave are divided by cornice pilasters with stucco decoration. There are stucco cut fields on the ceiling of the ship.

References

External links

Villages in Mělník District